Flavio Vanzella (born 4 March 1964) is a former Italian professional road bicycle racer. He was professional in 1989 to 1998. He won 3 victories. In the 1994 Tour de France he wore the yellow jersey for 2 days. Other victories included a stage win in the Euskal Bizikleta, a stage win in the 1995 Tour de Suisse and the Giro del Veneto. He also competed in the team time trial at the 1988 Summer Olympics.

Palmarès 

1986
Regio-Tour
1987
World Championship, Road, 100 km team time trial for amateurs (with Roberto Fortunato, Eros Poli and Mario Scirea)
1994
Tour de France:
Wearing yellow jersey for two days
1995
Giro del Veneto

References

External links 
Palmarès of Flavio Vanzella

Official Tour de France results for Flavio Vanzella

1964 births
Living people
Italian male cyclists
Cyclists from the Province of Treviso
Tour de Suisse stage winners
UCI Road World Champions (elite men)
Olympic cyclists of Italy
Cyclists at the 1988 Summer Olympics